The Morse River is a  tidal river in Phippsburg, Maine.

See also
List of rivers of Maine

References

Maine Streamflow Data from the USGS
Maine Watershed Data From Environmental Protection Agency

Rivers of Sagadahoc County, Maine
Rivers of Maine